The Edgar Percival E.P.9 was a 1950s British light utility aircraft designed by Edgar Percival and initially built by his company, Edgar Percival Aircraft Limited and later as the Lancashire Aircraft Prospector by the Lancashire Aircraft Company.

Design and development
In 1954, Edgar Percival formed Edgar Percival Aircraft Limited at Stapleford Aerodrome, England, his original company had become part of the Hunting Group. His first new design, the Edgar Percival P.9 was a utility aircraft designed for agricultural use. The aircraft was a high-wing monoplane with an unusual pod and boom fuselage. The pod and boom design allowed the aircraft to be fitted with a hopper for crop spraying. The pilot and one passenger sat together with room for four more passengers. The clamshell side and rear doors also allowed the aircraft to carry standard size wool and straw bales or 45 imperial gallon (55 U.S. gallon) oil drums or even livestock. Even when the hopper was fitted, a ground crew of three could be carried when moving between sites.

Operational history

The prototype (registered G-AOFU) first flew on 21 December 1955. After a demonstration tour of Australia four aircraft were ordered as crop-sprayers and an initial batch of 20 was built. Two aircraft were bought by the British Army in 1958. In the same year, Samlesbury Engineering Limited acquired rights to the design and formed a subsidiary named the Lancashire Aircraft Company. Lancashire Aircraft renamed the aircraft the Lancashire Prospector but only six more were built, the last of which was fitted with a Armstrong Siddeley Cheetah radial engine as the sole new build Mark Two.

In early 1958 World Wide Helicopters Ltd were operating three EP-9s out of Tripoli, Libya, on flights into and around the Libyan Sahara in support of oil exploration companies (mainly Esso-Libya). These aircraft were registered G-APCR, 'PCS and 'PCT, their construction numbers being 21, 24 and 25 respectively. In 1959 'PCR suffered a non-fatal accident in the far southwest of the country and may not have been subsequently recovered. The other two aircraft were sold in late 1959/early 1960.

In 1959 Kingsford Smith Aviation of Bankstown, Australia re-engined two aircraft with an Armstrong Siddeley Cheetah 10 radial engine as the EP-9C.

The E.P.9s in their various guises had a long and successful lifespan as private aircraft, utilized in multi-role STOL operations as an agricultural sprayer, light cargo aircraft, jump aircraft, air ambulance and glider tug. One EP-9 N747JC had a more chequered career and was one of two evaluated by the British Army Air Corps with serial XM819. It was once owned in the late 1960s by a gang of international smugglers who found it the ideal way to smuggle stolen furs and counterfeit Swiss francs between England and Belgium. Although the criminals were apprehended in 1969, the EP-9 was finally offered for sale in Belgium in 1972. After three years of pleasure flying in England, the aircraft was shipped to the United States where it was stored in a Wisconsin barn until 1999. After extensive restoration, N747JC appeared at Oshkosh in 2001-03, and in 2008 the aircraft was for sale. Per the current owner, the aircraft is for sale as of April 2015.

Variants
Edgar Percival E.P.9
Production aircraft powered by a 270 hp Lycoming GO-480-B1.B engine, 21 built.
Edgar Percival E.P.9C
Two aircraft re-engined in Australia by Kingsford Smith Aviation at Brisbane with a 375 hp Armstrong Siddeley Cheetah 10 radial engine.
Lancashire Aircraft Prospector
Continued production powered by a 295 hp Lycoming GO-480-G1.A6 engine, six built.
Lancashire Aircraft Prospector II
Prototype (c/n 47 G-ARDG) officially re-engined with a 375 hp Armstrong Siddeley Cheetah 10 radial engine.

 Total produced - 27 airframes (a further fuselage was not completed)

Survivors

 c/n 28 VH-EPN, formerly VH-DAI, restored and registered 1998 Victoria, Australia
 c/n 30 CF-NWI stored Reynolds-Alberta Museum, Wetaskiwin, Alberta, Canada
 c/n 36 ZS-CHZ, displayed as 'XM797', airworthy, based SAAF Historic Flight, Zwartkop, South Africa
 c/n 39 N747JC, airworthy, based Woodruff, Wisconsin, United States
 c/n 41 N8395 airworthy (Currently Being Restored), based Mississippi, United States
 c/n 42 ZK-PWZ airworthy, based Kairanga Aviation Ltd, New Zealand
 c/n 43 XM819 Museum of Army Flying, Middle Wallop, England

Specifications (E.P.9)

See also

References

Further reading
 "Edgar Percival E.P.9." Classic Wings Downunder, Issue 52, Vol. 12, No. 4.
 
 The Illustrated Encyclopedia of Aircraft (Part Work 1982–1985). London: Orbis Publishing, 1985.

External links

 Ground-looping an EP.9 - online article
 G-APXW painted as 'XM819' MoAF, Middle Wallop
 Interview with Jan Christie, owner of the real XM819 (N747JC)

1950s British agricultural aircraft
1950s British civil utility aircraft
1950s British military utility aircraft
High-wing aircraft
Single-engined tractor aircraft
EP09
Aircraft first flown in 1955
Conventional landing gear